Mahadevan (born 6 May 1961 as Mahadevan) is an Indian actor who has appeared in Tamil, Telugu, and Malayalam films. He made his breakthrough portraying the antagonist in Bala's Pithamagan, and the film's name has subsequently been used as a prefix to his stage name to distinguish him from other artistes called Mahadevan. In Telugu, he is credited as Ramaraju.

Partial filmography

Tamil films

Telugu films

Malayalam films

Kannada films

Television
 2015: Suryavamsam
 2022: Maa Neella Tank, as Narasimham, released on Zee5.

See also
Cinema of India

References

Male actors in Tamil cinema
Living people
Male actors from Chennai
Indian male film actors
1961 births
Male actors in Telugu cinema
Male actors in Malayalam cinema